Until 1 January 2007 Galten municipality was a municipality (Danish, kommune) in Aarhus County in the eastern part of the Jutland peninsula in central Denmark. The municipality covered an area of 72.73 km2, and had a total population of 11,086 (2005).  Its last mayor was Jens Grønlund, a member of the Venstre (Liberal Party) political party. The site of its municipal council was the town of Galten.

Galten municipality ceased to exist as the result of Kommunalreformen ("The Municipality Reform" of 2007).  It was merged with existing Hørning, Ry, and Skanderborg municipalities to form the new Skanderborg municipality.  This created a municipality with an area of 416 km2 and a total population of 49,469 (2005) in Region Midtjylland.

External links

References 
 Municipal statistics: NetBorger Kommunefakta, delivered from KMD aka Kommunedata (Municipal Data)
 Municipal merges and neighbors: Eniro new municipalities map

Former municipalities of Denmark